Campbell-Bannerman is a compound surname, composed of Campbell and Bannerman. It is also a political family in the United Kingdom.

Notable people with this name include:

 Charlotte, Lady Campbell-Bannerman (1832–1906), the wife of Henry Campbell-Bannerman
 David Campbell Bannerman (born 1960), British Conservative politician
 Henry Campbell-Bannerman (1836–1908), British Liberal politician

Compound surnames
English-language surnames
Surnames of English origin
Surnames of Scottish origin
Surnames of British Isles origin